The 2012 season was the Seattle Seahawks' 37th in the National Football League (NFL) and their third under head coach Pete Carroll. The Seahawks had a three-way quarterback competition with Tarvaris Jackson, Matt Flynn and rookie Russell Wilson. Jackson was traded to the Bills, and Wilson won the job.

The Seahawks finished 11–5, an improvement from a 7–9 record in 2011, and it marked Seattle's first winning season since 2007. The team was 4–0 during the preseason. Their 11 victories was the third best in franchise history. The Seahawks went undefeated at home for the third time in franchise history, after 2003 and 2005. Additionally, with their victory over the Washington Redskins at FedExField in the Wild Card round, the Seahawks won their first road playoff game since 1983. However, despite holding a lead with just 30 seconds left in regulation, the Seahawks lost to the Atlanta Falcons in the Divisional round by a score of 30–28.

New logo and uniform
On April 3, 2012, Nike unveiled the new design for the uniforms and logo for the Seahawks. The new designs incorporate a new accent color, "Wolf Grey", and the main colors are "College Navy" and "Action Green". The uniforms incorporate "feather trims", twelve feathers printed on the neckline and down each pant leg to represent the "12th Man", referring to the team's fans.

2012 draft class

Notes
 The team traded its original first-round selection (#12 overall) to the Philadelphia Eagles in exchange for the Eagles' first- (#15 overall), fourth- (#114 overall) and sixth- (#172 overall) selections.
 The team traded its original second-round selection (#43 overall) to the New York Jets in exchange for the Jets' second- (#47 overall), fifth- (#154 overall) and seventh- (#232 overall) round selections.
 The team traded its original fifth-round selection (#147 overall) and a 2011 fourth-round selection to the Buffalo Bills in exchange for running back Marshawn Lynch.
 The team traded its original seventh-round selection (#219 overall) to the Detroit Lions in exchange for tackle Tyler Polumbus.
 The team acquired this seventh-round selection (#225 overall) as part of a trade that sent linebacker Aaron Curry to the Oakland Raiders.

Staff

Final roster

     Starters in bold.
 (*) Denotes players that were selected for the 2013 Pro Bowl.

Schedule

Preseason

Regular season

Bold indicates division opponents.
Source: 2012 NFL season results

 #  Indicates that the Seahawks were the visiting team in the Bills Toronto Series.

Postseason

Standings

Game summaries

Preseason

Week P1: vs. Tennessee Titans

Week P2: at Denver Broncos

Week P3: at Kansas City Chiefs

Week P4: vs. Oakland Raiders

Regular season

Week 1: at Arizona Cardinals

With the loss, the Seahawks started their season 0–1. This would be the last time the seahawks lost a regular season game in Arizona until 2020.

Week 2: vs. Dallas Cowboys

After facing the Cardinals on the road, the Seahawks returned home for a home game against the Cowboys. The game went very well for the Seahawks as the team improved to 1–1. This is also the first win for rookie QB Russell Wilson.

Week 3: vs. Green Bay Packers

The game had a controversial ending when Seattle quarterback Russell Wilson threw a Hail Mary pass to the endzone on the final play that appeared to have been intercepted by Green Bay. However, while one official signaled the interception, the other official signaled a touchdown for Seattle by receiver Golden Tate, based on the rule that a catch with simultaneous possession is ruled a completion for the offense. The play was reviewed and the officials awarded the touchdown to Seattle. The call by the officials, who were replacements for the customary and more experienced officials, was met with outrage by other NFL players and fans around the country who believed Green Bay should have been awarded the interception and thus the game. Many also claimed the officials had missed an offensive pass interference call committed by Tate on Packers cornerback Sam Shields that also would have won the game for Green Bay. The NFL released an official statement the next day that, while acknowledging that pass interference should have been called on Tate, supported the decision to uphold the play as simultaneous possession.

With the win, the Seahawks improved to 2–1. With the 49ers' loss to the Vikings the previous day, Seattle and San Francisco were now tied for 2nd in the NFC West behind the 3-0 Arizona Cardinals. The Seahawks' defense accomplished a noteworthy achievement, sacking Packers quarterback Aaron Rodgers 8 times, a career-high; this was even more impressive because all eight sacks occurred in the first half of the game.

The game's final play, dubbed the "Fail Mary" or the "Inaccurate Reception", is still viewed as the catalyst for the return of the NFL's customary officials due to the ineptitude of the replacement officials.

Week 4: at St. Louis Rams

With the loss, the Seahawks fell to 2–2. QB Russell Wilson also had his first career game with no passing touchdown.

Week 5: at Carolina Panthers

With the win, Seattle's first of three road wins during the regular season, the Seahawks improved to 3–2.

Week 6: vs. New England Patriots

With the win, the Seahawks improved to 4–2, and with losses by the 49ers and Cardinals, the team moved into a tie for first in the NFC West. This was head coach Pete Carroll's first meeting with the Patriots since he was fired by the organization following the 1999 season. Carroll served as their head coach from 1997–99, the last one before Bill Belichick's hiring in 2000. This game is also infamous among Patriots fans as the genesis of the Richard Sherman/Tom Brady "You Mad, Bro" meme.

Week 7: at San Francisco 49ers

With the loss, the Seahawks fell to 4–3 moving into a 2nd-place tie with the Cardinals in the NFC West.

Week 8: at Detroit Lions

With the loss, the Seahawks dropped to 4–4.

Week 9: vs. Minnesota Vikings

With the win, the Seahawks improved to 5–4.

Week 10: vs. New York Jets

The Seahawks improved to 6–4.

Week 12: at Miami Dolphins

The Seahawks engaged in a back-and-forth affair, with six lead changes or ties. Russell Wilson touchdowns to Anthony McCoy and Golden Tate and a 98-yard Leon Washington kick return for a touchdown were answered by rushing scores from Reggie Bush and Daniel Thomas.  With the Seahawks up 21–14, rookie Dolphins quarterback Ryan Tannehill found Charles Clay from 29 yards out.  Tied 21–21, the Seahawks had to punt with 1:39 to go, and Tannehill drove the Dolphins in range for the winning Dan Carpenter field goal.

The game was interrupted briefly with 1:40 to go in the third quarter following a 19-yard Tannehill run; the sprinklers at Sun Life Stadium suddenly switched on, soaking the field for roughly one minute.

Week 13: at Chicago Bears

With their second road win, the Seahawks improved to 7–5.

Week 14: vs. Arizona Cardinals

Biggest margin of victory in Seahawks franchise history
Biggest margin of defeat in Cardinals franchise history
Russell Wilson threw one touchdown pass before being pulled from the game.
Matt Flynn gets his first playing time for Seattle.
Eight turnovers committed by Arizona, including four interceptions
Wilson became the first rookie quarterback to start and win his first six games at home since the 1970 merger.

Week 15: at Buffalo Bills
Bills Toronto Series

With its third and final regular season road victory, Seattle rose to 9–5.

Week 16: vs. San Francisco 49ers

The Seahawks won and clinched at least a playoff spot. In order to win the NFC West, the Seahawks needed to beat the St. Louis Rams at home the following week, have the 49ers lose to the Arizona Cardinals. A Packers loss to the Vikings would give Seattle a first round bye as well. However, a loss or a 49ers win would result in the Seahawks being the #5 seed heading on the road for the Wild Card Round in January.

Week 17: vs. St. Louis Rams

With the NFC West title still up for grabs, the Seahawks finished their season at home against the Rams. Avoiding being swept by their foes, they finished the season with a record of 11–5, and a perfect 8–0 at home. However, with the Niners' win over the Cardinals, the team would end up 2nd in the division and the NFC's #5 seed.

Postseason

Seattle entered the postseason as the #5 seed in the NFC.

NFC Wild Card Playoff: at #4 Washington Redskins

After Redskins quarterback Robert Griffin III went down with a knee injury in the second half, Seattle outscored Washington 3-0 to win 24-14. Seattle would move on to take on the #1 seed Atlanta Falcons.

NFC Divisional Playoff: at #1 Atlanta Falcons

The Seahawks fell behind, trailing Atlanta 20–0 at halftime and 27–7 with just over 17 minutes remaining. Seattle scored three touchdowns in the fourth quarter to take the lead 28–27 with 31 seconds left to play. But Matt Ryan quickly completed two long passes. A mystery time out, credited to Seattle, was blown by officials just as Matt Bryant kicked and missed a 49-yard field goal try, allowing Atlanta to kick again and giving them the victory. Russell Wilson's Hail Mary pass on the final play was intercepted by Julio Jones in the end zone (Wilson's only interception in the game), ending Seattle's season.

References

External links
 
 2012 Seattle Seahawks season at ESPN

Seattle
Seattle Seahawks seasons
Seattle Seahawks